Hypogastruridae is a family of springtails. Members of the family are common and widespread with a cosmopolitan distribution of about 660 species in about 40 genera.

Selected genera
These 43 genera belong to the family Hypogastruridae:

 Acherongia Massoud & Thibaud, 1985 i c g
 Acherontides Bonet, 1945 i c g
 Acherontiella Absolon, 1913 i c g
 Acheroxenylla Ellis, 1976 i c g
 Achorutes g
 Austrogastrura Thibaud & Palacios-Vargas, 1999 i c g
 Barbagastrura Massoud, Najt & Thibaud, 1975 i c g
 Biscoia Salmon, 1962 i c g
 Bonetogastrura Thibaud, 1974 i c g
 Celegastrura Palacios-Vargas, Mendoza & Villalobos, 2000 i c g
 Ceratophysella Börner in Brohmer, 1932 i c g b
 Chinogastrura Rusek, 1967 g
 Choreutinula Paclt, 1944 i c g
 Cosberella Wray, 1963 i c g
 Denigastrura Stach, 1949 i c g
 Ecuadogastrura Palacios-Vargas & Thibaud, 2001 i c g
 Gnathogastrura Dìaz & Najt, 1983 i c g
 Hypogastrura Bourlet, 1839 i c g b
 Jacutogastrura Martynova, 1981 i c g
 Kodiakia g
 Mesachorutes Absolon, 1900 i c g
 Mesogastrura Bonet, 1930 i c g
 Microgastrura Stach, 1922 i c g
 Mitchellania Wray, 1953 i c g
 Neobeckerella Wray, 1952 i c g
 Octoacanthella Martynova, 1961 i c g
 Ongulogastrura Thibaud & Massoud, 1983 i c g
 Orogastrura Deharveng & Gers, 1979 i c g
 Parawillemia Izarra, 1975 i c g
 Paraxenylla Murphy, 1965 i c g
 Pseudacherontides Djanaschvili, 1971 i c g
 Schaefferia Absolon, 1900 i c g b
 Schoettella Schäffer, 1896 i c g b
 Stenogastrura Christiansen & Bellinger, 1980 i c g
 Tafallia Bonet, 1947 i c g
 Taurogastrura Vargovitsh, 2007 g
 Thibaudylla Najt & Weiner in Najt, & Matile, 1997 i c g
 Triacanthella Schäffer, 1897 i c g
 Typhlogastrura Bonet, 1930 i c g
 Willemgastrura Pereira de Oliveira & Thibaud, 1988 i c g
 Willemia Börner, 1901 i c g
 Xenylla Tullberg, 1869 i c g b
 Xenyllogastrura Denis, 1932 i c g

Data sources: i = ITIS, c = Catalogue of Life, g = GBIF, b = Bugguide.net

References

Collembola
Animals described in 1906
Arthropod families